The Opera House is a music venue in Toronto, Ontario, Canada. It is one of the city's most historic performing venues, opening in 1909. It has also been a cinema and a live theatre venue. It is located at 735 Queen Street East, east of downtown in the Riverdale neighbourhood.

History
The building opened in 1909 as the La Plaza Theatre, an Edwardian vaudeville stage. Seating almost 700, it was the main entertainment venue in the primarily working-class neighbourhood. As films eclipsed vaudeville, the theatre was turned into a cinema, continuing to use the name La Plaza Theatre until the 1960s, and later under a series of other names.

As multiplexes made large single screen venues no longer viable as cinemas, it became a performing arts venue. In the late 1980s, it was home to the successful gospel musical Mama, I Want to Sing!. In the early 1990s, it was renamed "The Opera House" and became a music venue.

Other uses
The venue was used for the filming of the music video for the Headstones song, "Smile and Wave".
The venue was used for the filming of the 1998 music video for the Barenaked Ladies song, "Brian Wilson".
The venue was used for the filming of a scene in the 2000 film Loser in which the band Everclear performed a concert.
The venue was used for the filming of the music video for The Tragically Hip song, "My Music at Work".

References

External links
 The Opera House

Music venues in Toronto
Nightclubs in Toronto
1909 establishments in Ontario
Former cinemas in Toronto